George Bickham may refer to:

George Bickham the Elder (1684–1758), English writing master and engraver
George Bickham the Younger ( 1706–1771), English etcher and engraver